Tarkieb is a 2000 Indian crime drama film directed by Esmayeel Shroff and produced by Jay Mehta. It stars Nana Patekar, Tabu, Shilpa Shetty, Aditya Pancholi, Milind Soman and Ashutosh Rana. The film was shot in Panchmarhi.

Plot
A clothes washer girl finds a hand in a creek where she was washing clothes. She and other clothes washers nearby gather together and summon the police. After an investigation, the police find various parts of this body, and determine it to be that of a young woman. They do not succeed in finding the head of the corpse, and a check with missing persons produces negative results. When Inspector Pyare Mohan, who was assigned to this investigation, receives a threat by an anonymous caller on the phone, he recommends that this file be closed. Then additional evidence surfaces, and the case is turned over to CBI Office Jasraj Patel, who along with his assistant, Gangaram, arrive to take over this investigation. They find out that the corpse is indeed of a young woman, Roshni Choubey. Roshni comes from a poor family of four unmarried sisters. Roshni seemed to be involved with several men of Army Hospital, including Dr. Kamal Dogra (Ashutosh Rana), Mohan Multani (Aditya Pancholi), Captain Ajit Verma (Milind Soman) and Bishen Nanda (Akhilendra Mishra) - all of whom have a motive for killing her and disposing of her body. Determining who is the real killer - is the challenge that now faces Jasraj, apart from the telephonic threat that he too has received from the anonymous caller. Patel delves into the case even more deeply, putting his life at risk as the killer is constantly trying to bump him off. Eventually, Patel concludes that Roshni might not have been killed by any of the men she was involved with.

In the end, it is revealed that Bishen Nanda has killed Roshni as she becomes the object of his lust. Jasraj Patel finally succeeds in nabbing Roshni's murderer and putting him behind bars.

Cast

 Nana Patekar as CBI Asst Director Jasraj Patel
 Tabu as Lt Roshni Bharawaj
 Shilpa Shetty as Lt Preeti Sharma
 Aditya Pancholi as Mohan Multani, Businessman
 Milind Soman as Captain  Ajit Sharma née Verma, AMC
 Ashutosh Rana as Major (Dr) Kamal Dogra
 Tiku Talsania as Ganga Ram / Musafir Singh
 Akhilendra Mishra as ex-L/ Nk Bishan Nanda, Mess & Canteen contractor
 Raghuvir Yadav as Nainsukh (Blind shopkeeper)
 Razzak Khan as Dr. Sunder Trivedi, Gold-tooth specialist
 Javed Khan as Ice cream vendor
 Deepak Qazir as Inspector Pyare Mohan
 Vinod Nagpal as Chandrakant Choubey, Roshni's father
 Cyrus Herald as Police Commissioner
 Annapoorna as Lali
 Pradeep Karnaik as CBI Director
 Meghana Tiwari as Shanti, Roshni's immediate younger sister
 Farah as Second  Roshni Ashwini, Roshni's second sister for Roshni
 Aayukti as Nandini, Roshni's youngest sister
 Smith as Multani's son
 Neha as Multani's daughter
 Menaka as Call girl
 Qamar Khan as RTO Officer
 Razzaq Siddiqui as Station Master
 Amit Srivastava as Hotel boy
 Shahzad Sheikh as Driver
 Suzanne Rodrigues as Singer in Club Dil Mera Tar Se

Additionally Shaan and Sagarika appeared in a special appearance in the song "Dil Mera Tarse"

Soundtrack
All songs were written by Nida Fazli. Soundtrack is Disc  Mobile available on Zee Music.

Reception
Taran Adarsh of IndiaFM gave the film 2 stars out of 5, writing ″On the whole, TARKIEB lacks in shock-value (a must for any murder mystery!) and repeat-value (for people to throng the theatres despite knowing the identity of the killer!). Even the initial-value is missing, which combined together will result in the film facing a rough time at the box-office.″ Kanchana Suggu of Rediff.com wrote ″To cut a long story short, Tarkieb is… well, pathetic. Going by the way it began, it could have been a good thriller. Unfortunately, it isn't.″

References

External links

2000s Hindi-language films
Indian detective films
2000 films
Films scored by Aadesh Shrivastava